Charles Gough may refer to:

Charles Gough (artist) (1784–1805), artist of the romantic period
Charles John Stanley Gough (1832–1912), soldier who won the Victoria Cross during the Sepoy mutiny
Frederick Gough (MP for Horsham) (Charles Frederick Howard Gough, 1901–1977), soldier and MP for Horsham
Charlie Gough (1939–2015), footballer
Charlie Gough (programmer), one of the creators of Halo